Camera resectioning is the process of estimating the parameters of a pinhole camera model approximating the camera that produced a given photograph or video; it determines which incoming light ray is associated with each pixel on the resulting image. Basically, the process determines the pose of the pinhole camera.

Usually, the camera parameters are represented in a 3 × 4 projection matrix called the camera matrix.
The extrinsic parameters define the camera pose (position and orientation) while the intrinsic parameters specify the camera image format (focal length, pixel size, and image origin).

This process is often called geometric camera calibration or simply camera calibration, although that term may also refer to photometric camera calibration or be restricted for the estimation of the intrinsic parameters only. Exterior orientation and interior orientation refer to the determination of only the extrinsic and intrinsic parameters, respectively.

The classic camera calibration requires special objects in the scene, which is not required in camera auto-calibration.
Camera resectioning is often used in the application of stereo vision where the camera projection matrices of two cameras are used to calculate the 3D world coordinates of a point viewed by both cameras.

Formulation
The camera projection matrix is derived from the intrinsic and extrinsic parameters of the camera, and is often represented by the series of transformations; e.g., a matrix of camera intrinsic parameters, a 3 × 3 rotation matrix, and a translation vector. The camera projection matrix can be used to associate points in a camera's image space with locations in 3D world space.

Homogeneous coordinates 
In both cases, they are represented in homogeneous coordinates (i.e. they have an additional last component, which is initially, by convention, a 1), which is the most common notation in robotics and rigid body transforms.

Projection 
Referring to the pinhole camera model, a camera matrix  is used to denote a projective mapping from world coordinates to pixel coordinates.

where .  by convention are the x and y coordinates of the pixel in the camera,  is the intrinsic matrix as described below, and  form the extrinsic matrix as described below.  are the coordinates of the source of the light ray which hits the camera sensor in world coordinates, relative to the origin of the world.

Intrinsic parameters 

The  contains 5 intrinsic parameters of the specific camera model. These parameters encompass focal length, image sensor format, and camera principal point.  

  represents the skew coefficient between the x and the y axis, and is often 0.
 and  represent the principal point, which would be ideally in the center of the image.

Nonlinear intrinsic parameters such as lens distortion are also important although they cannot be included in the linear camera model described by the intrinsic parameter matrix.  Many modern camera calibration algorithms estimate these intrinsic parameters as well in the form of non-linear optimisation techniques. This is done in the form of optimising the camera and distortion parameters in the form of what is generally known as bundle adjustment.

Extrinsic parameters

 are the extrinsic parameters which denote the coordinate system transformations from 3D world coordinates to 3D camera coordinates. Equivalently, the extrinsic parameters define the position of the camera center and the camera's heading in world coordinates.  is the position of the origin of the world coordinate system expressed in coordinates of the camera-centered coordinate system.  is often mistakenly considered the position of the camera.

Camera calibration is often used as an early stage in computer vision.

When a camera is used, light from the environment is focused on an image plane and captured.  This process reduces the dimensions of the data taken in by the camera from three to two (light from a 3D scene is stored on a 2D image).  Each pixel on the image plane therefore corresponds to a shaft of light from the original scene.

Algorithms
There are many different approaches to calculate the intrinsic and extrinsic parameters for a specific camera setup. The most common ones are: 
 Direct linear transformation (DLT) method
 Zhang's method
 Tsai's method
 Selby's method (for X-ray cameras)

Zhang's method

Zhang model  is a camera calibration method that uses traditional calibration techniques (known calibration points) and self-calibration techniques (correspondence between the calibration points when they are in different positions). To perform a full calibration by the Zhang method at least three different images of the calibration target/gauge are required, either by moving the gauge or the camera itself. If some of the intrinsic parameters are given as data (orthogonality of the image or optical center coordinates) the number of images required can be reduced to two.
 
In a first step, an approximation of the estimated projection matrix  between the calibration target and the image plane is determined using  DLT method. Subsequently, applying self-calibration techniques to obtained the image of the absolute conic matrix [Link].

Derivation
Assume we have a homography  that maps points  on a "probe plane"  to points  on the image.

The circular points  lie on both our probe plane  and on the absolute conic . The circular points project as

.

Tsai's Algorithm
 
It is a 2-stage algorithm, calculating the pose (3D Orientation, and x-axis and y-axis translation) in first stage. In second stage it computes the focal length, distortion coefficients and the z-axis translation.

Selby's method (for X-ray cameras)

Selby's camera calibration method addresses the auto-calibration of X-ray camera systems.
X-ray camera systems, consisting of the X-ray generating tube and a solid state detector can be modelled as pinhole camera systems, comprising 9 intrinsic and extrinsic camera parameters.
Intensity based registration based on an arbitrary X-ray image and a reference model (as a tomographic dataset) can then be used to determine the relative camera parameters without the need of a special calibration body or any ground-truth data.

See also 
 3D pose estimation
 Augmented reality
 Augmented virtuality
 Eight-point algorithm
 Mixed reality
 Pinhole camera model
 Perspective-n-Point
 Rational polynomial coefficient

References

External links 

 Zhang's Camera Calibration and Tsai's Calibration Software on LGPL licence 
 Zhang's Camera Calibration Method with Software
 C++ Camera Calibration Toolbox with source code
 Camera Calibration Toolbox for Matlab
 The DLR CalDe and DLR CalLab Camera Calibration Toolbox
 Camera Calibration - Augmented reality lecture at TU Muenchen, Germany
 Camera calibration (using ARToolKit)
 A Four-step Camera Calibration Procedure with Implicit Image Correction
 mrcal: a high-fidelity calibration toolkit with thorough uncertainty propagation

Geometry in computer vision
Mixed reality
Stereophotogrammetry